This is a list of films produced by the Ollywood film industry based in Bhubaneshwar and Cuttack in 2003:

A-Z

References

2003
Ollywood
2000s in Orissa
Ollywood